Alsodes is a genus of alsodid frogs found in Chile and Argentina. It is the most species-rich frog genus in Patagonia. Common name spiny-chest frogs has been coined for them.

Description
Characteristic for this genus is that during the reproductive season, adult males have thorny structures on the fingers and rounded spiny patches on the chest. Breeding takes place in high-elevation streams, and tadpoles have slow development, including overwintering under ice cover.

Species
There are 19 species in the genus:

References 

 
Alsodidae
Amphibians of South America
Amphibian genera
Taxa named by Thomas Bell (zoologist)